Lisa Borsholt (born 5 April 1962) is a Canadian former swimmer. She competed at the 1976 Summer Olympics and the 1984 Summer Olympics.

References

External links
 

1962 births
Living people
Canadian female swimmers
Olympic swimmers of Canada
Swimmers at the 1976 Summer Olympics
Swimmers at the 1984 Summer Olympics
Universiade medalists in swimming
Swimmers from Vancouver
Commonwealth Games medallists in swimming
Commonwealth Games gold medallists for Canada
Swimmers at the 1978 Commonwealth Games
Universiade bronze medalists for Canada
Canadian female breaststroke swimmers
Medalists at the 1983 Summer Universiade
Medallists at the 1978 Commonwealth Games
20th-century Canadian women